Colic weed is a common name for several plants and may refer to:

 Aletris spp.
 Corydalis flavula, native to the eastern United States
 Dicentra spp.